This Is My Truth Tell Me Yours is the fifth studio album by Welsh alternative rock band Manic Street Preachers. It was released on 14 September 1998 by record label Epic.

Like its 1996 predecessor Everything Must Go, This Is My Truth Tell Me Yours was a commercial and critical success. The album debuted at number 1 in the UK Albums Chart, selling 136,000 copies, going Gold in the first week. It sold well in the United Kingdom, Europe and Asia, and represented a change in the sound from the furious alternative rock sound to a more melodic and tender approach. By March 1999 the album was Triple Platinum in the UK alone and since its release it has sold more than five million copies worldwide. It earned the band further nominations and accolades at the BRIT Awards in 1999. This is their first album whose lyrics were solely written by bassist Nicky Wire; their previous album still had songs contributed by the late rhythm guitarist Richey Edwards.

Music and lyrics 

The title is a quotation taken from a speech given by Aneurin Bevan, a Labour Party politician from Wales. Its working title was simply Manic Street Preachers. The cover photograph was taken on Black Rock Sands near Porthmadog, Wales.

It was the first Manics album to feature lyrics solely by Nicky Wire, while all the music was written by the duo of James Dean Bradfield and Sean Moore. This Is My Truth Tell Me Yours shows considerably less hard rock influence than their previous efforts and finds the band experimenting with sound and production techniques. It features cleaner guitar sounds in general and the increased use of additional instrumentation such as strings, keyboards and both real and programmed percussion. Clash magazine described the album's sound as "a glacial distillation of the anthemic rock that had served them so well two years previous", an approach further developed on 2004's Lifeblood.

In an interview Dave Eringa admitted that: "James was piling on the pressure at the time. He's got this idea that I work best under pressure; it's about putting me under as much as he can all the time!". After recording "If You Tolerate This Your Children Will Be Next", he also said that the song went through a four-month gestation period.

Eringa said that even in the week of release he was nervous: "You get midweek chart positions and sales figures all week, and it was my first chance of a possible Number One, which is such an exciting thing. Every day it was just getting worse and worse; I was becoming more and more psychotic. If it had been released the same week as a Nirvana record or an Oasis record, you'd just have to put your hands up and say 'c'est la vie' – but the horror of losing out to Steps would have been unbelievable!".

James Dean Bradfield has cited John Frusciante as the main influence for the intro riff of "My Little Empire". The final track, "S.Y.M.M.", an initialism for "South Yorkshire Mass Murderer", refers to the involvement of police in the Hillsborough disaster of 1989, in which 97 people died in a human crush during a football match at the Hillsborough Stadium in Sheffield.

Release 

The album was preceded by the single "If You Tolerate This Your Children Will Be Next", released on 24 August 1998, which debuted at No. 1 on the UK Singles Chart, their first single to do so. The album itself was released on 14 September 1998, and its sales were such that a spokesperson for Virgin Megastores claimed it to be the biggest selling album of the year. It reached No. 1 on the UK Albums Chart, becoming their only album to do so until The Ultra Vivid Lament reached the same position in 2021. Like the preceding single, This Is My Truth Tell Me Yours prevented Steps from topping the chart; "One for Sorrow" was held off at No. 2 by "If You Tolerate This Your Children Will Be Next" while the album Step One was also relegated to No. 2. The album remained at the top of the albums chart for three weeks, selling around 250,000 copies in those three weeks. The album has been certified Triple Platinum in the UK and spent a total time of 74 weeks on the UK Albums Chart.

Apart from the lead single, the album presented another three singles, with the second one being "The Everlasting". "You Stole the Sun from My Heart" was released on March 1999 and was nominated for Best British Single at the 2000 BRIT Awards. The final single from the album was "Tsunami", which was inspired by The Silent Twins, June and Jennifer Gibbons, who gave up speaking when they were young, became involved in crime and ended up being sent to Broadmoor Hospital. Both singles "The Everlasting" and "Tsunami" peaked at number 11, while "You Stole the Sun from My Heart" ended up peaking at number 5 on the UK Singles Chart. In Japan the band released "Nobody Loved You", replacing the UK single "The Everlasting".

Around the world the album was as successful as it was in the UK. In Sweden the album managed to remain in the chart for a total of 43 weeks, debuting at number 2, and peaking at number one in its second week. In Finland the album sold enough to stay in the charts for 32 weeks, peaking at number one, securing the top spot for two consecutive weeks. In Ireland the album also debuted at number one and charted within the top 20 in Norway, New Zealand, Denmark, Austria and Australia. It was the number one album in Europe's for two weeks, and it has been certified Platinum (one million copies) by the International Federation of the Phonographic Industry. The album's success ensured that by 1999 the band had sold more than three million albums worldwide. To the present day This Is My Truth Tell Me Yours has sold more than five million copies since its release.

On 7 December 2018, This Is My Truth Tell Me Yours was re-released as a '20 Year Collector's Edition' on streaming services, as well as physically on three CDs and two LPs. As well as being remastered, the track listing was revised, with "Nobody Loved You" replaced by the former B-side "Prologue to History". The CD and streaming releases also include various demos, B-sides and remixes.

Critical reception 

The album was generally well received by critics.

NME awarded the album with a 7/10, stating: "No longer is James Dean Bradfield required to turn metrical somersaults in order to translate screeds of vituperative prose into the realm of the performable. Nicky's opaque verses lend themselves more readily to poetic contemplation, and James responds with his most incontrovertibly delicate vocals, singing as opposed to lacerating his larynx in the quest for empathy."

Sputnikmusic wrote in 2014 that the album was "the most indecisive piece of works [sic] in the Manic's [sic] canon. Technically proficient and brilliantly written in spats", finishing with: "Still, This Is My Truth's spot as one of the bands [sic] weakest releases is often overstated, if only because the rot was just beginning and the future predicted a bigger storm to come."

Sarah Zupko, writing for Pitchfork, said that the album was her "album of the year so far", stating that "The Manic Street Preachers are also one of the few groups capable of integrating orchestral instruments in a way that still produces great rock music (check out the cello in "My Little Empire"), always avoiding the schmaltzy elevator music that can result when some rock musos get a hold of an orchestra. Meanwhile, they manage to infuse some quite dour lyrics with some of the most haunting melodies in rock this side of Radiohead. Bradfield and Moore seldom choose the obvious chords, arrangements and melodies, resulting in music that is heads- and- tails above almost any band on the planet."

The Independent gave the album a positive review, saying that: "In their first album as a true trio, the Manics deliver another slab of anthemic rock that manages to be gloomy yet uplifting. Their recent hit single is one of the more joyous moments here, but they also offer class introspection."

AllMusic praised the album, calling it "a strangely effective fusion of string-drenched, sweeping arena rock and impassioned, brutally honest punk", noting that it contains "a searing passion and intelligence that is unmatched among their peers on either side of the ocean – and, in doing so, it emphasizes the Manics' uniqueness as one of the few bands of the '90s that can deliver albums as bracing intellectually as they are sonically."

Among less positive comments Entertainment Weekly gave the album a C−, concluding with: "Their best efforts, particularly the 1994 screed called Holy Bible, were triumphs of sheer will and caustic attitude. Sadly, the albums made after his [Edwards'] departure prove the Preachers were, after all, a James gang. How else to explain such treacly dreck on This Is My Truth Tell Me Yours as You Stole the Sun From My Heart and You're Tender and You're Tired. This is my truth: The album is lucky to get a C−".

Awards 

The album won Best British Album, and the band Best British Group, at the 1999 BRIT Awards. The album was nominated for the 1999 Mercury Prize, but just like the previous album it failed to win the award. In the NME Awards in 1999, the band won every single big prize, Best Band, Best Album, Best Live Act, Best Single and Best Video.

Accolades 

The album was a critical success; on end-of-the-year critics lists it achieved the following accolades:

 It achieved number 14 in Kerrang! Albums of the Year 1998.
 A spot in Q Magazine's Albums of 1998.
 Placed at number 29 in Melody Maker End of Year Critic List for 1998.
 NME listed This Is My Truth Tell Me Yours as the 24th best album of 1998.
 Melody Maker also listed "If You Tolerate This Your Children Will Be Next" as the sixth best single of the year.
 NME also named "If You Tolerate This Your Children Will Be Next" the fifth best single of the year.

Reflecting on the album, Drowned in Sound in 2008 said that This Is My Truth Tell Me Yours is "sad" and is a "stately, tender lament to their past" stating that: "Just as the Holy Bible was Richey's, this is Nicky's more than anything; confused where Richey was focused, afraid of loneliness while Richey embraced it. You can't escape the idea that he almost feels guilty for what they'd turned into, and that imbues This Is My Truth, Tell Me Yours with a sadness and longing that wasn't immediately evident on its initial release."

Looking back on the catalogue of the band, Clash stated the following about the record: "Misfiring album closer and Hillsborough referencing 'S.Y.M.M.' was a rare error, brushing up against eternal favourites 'You Stole The Sun From My Heart' and 'Tsunami' and the delicate shimmer of 'Black Dog on My Shoulder', which more than make up for it. Although a little close to AOR with the preference for mid-paced melancholia, the Manics were now making grown up, actually rather beautiful music. Which, of course, couldn't last."

The album is ranked number 987 in All-Time Top 1000 Albums (3rd edition, 2000).

Track listing

20th Anniversary Collectors' Edition

Personnel 
Manic Street Preachers

 James Dean Bradfield – lead vocals, lead and rhythm guitar, acoustic guitar, 12-string guitar (tracks 2, 10 and 12), electric sitar (tracks 5 and 7), Omnichord (tracks 4 and 5), melody horn (track 10)
 Sean Moore – drums, programming (tracks 1, 3 and 5)
 Nicky Wire – bass guitar, acoustic bass (tracks 6 and 11), vocals (track 6), Hammond organ (track 4)

Additional personnel

 Nick Nasmyth – Wurlitzer electric piano (tracks 1–4, 7 and 13), Mellotron (tracks 8 and 13), keyboards (tracks 5 and 7), piano (track 8), Vox Continental (track 11), accordion (track 9), yang-ching (track 7)
 Martin Ditcham – percussion (tracks 1, 3–5, 7, 8 and 11)
 Andy Duncan – percussion (tracks 2, 6, 10 and 12)
 Craig Pruess – sitar (track 5), tambura (track 5)
 Ken Barry – whistling (track 8)
 Sally Herbert – string arrangements (tracks 1, 5 and 11), violin (tracks 1, 5 and 11)
 Gini Ball and Anne Stephenson – violin (tracks 1 and 11)
 Jos Pook and Claire Orsler – viola (tracks 1, 5 and 11)
 Padlock McKiernan – tin whistle (tracks 4, 7 and 13)
 Dinah Beamish – cello (tracks 1 and 6)
 Fenella Barton, Nell Catchpole, Sue Dench, Margaret Roseberry, Sonia Slany, Jules Singleton and Ann Wood – additional string section (track 11)

Charts

Weekly charts

European charts

Year-end charts

Certifications

References 

Sources

External links 

This Is My Truth Tell Me Yours at YouTube (streamed copy where licensed)
 

Manic Street Preachers albums
1998 albums
Epic Records albums
Virgin Records albums
Brit Award for British Album of the Year
Pop rock albums by Welsh artists
Albums produced by Dave Eringa
Albums produced by Mike Hedges
Albums recorded at Rockfield Studios